Star Trek: The Continuing Mission is an independently produced, non-profit, science fiction series set in the Star Trek universe. The show, created by Sebastian Prooth and Andy Tyrer in July 2007, is released exclusively online in the form of downloadable audio dramas. Sebastian Prooth and Patrick McCray serve as the show’s Executive Producers.

The pilot episode, "Ghost Ship," was released on December 25, 2007, and since then seven more episodes have been released, the latest of which was "Cathedral in the Void" released May 10, 2014. The producers' stated goal is for future releases to be on a quarterly basis.

Summary
The Continuing Mission follows the adventures of the Trieste-class, USS Montana NCC-1786 and its crew led by seven humans and a Betazoid.  The premise involves the Montana and her crew’s unexpected transference from the 23rd century, around the time of Star Trek II: The Wrath of Khan, to the 24th century, approximately ten years prior to the continuity of Star Trek: The Next Generation where they are re-integrated into a very different Starfleet from which they came.

Both the USS Montana and its crew are original characters created specifically for this series.  Though references to canonical Star Trek names, places, and events appear in the series, the events depicted in the series are not official canon.

However, it is notable that the setting of Star Trek: Discovery in season 3 closely resembles story elements from ‘’The Continuing Mission’, especially the permanent transference of a Starfleet crew into a later timeline.

Cast and crew

Main cast
 Scott Martineck as Captain Paul Edwards (Season 2 )/ Science Officer Stephen Knight (Season 1)
 Tim Renshaw as Captain Paul Edwards (Season 1)
 Stephen Perkins as Commander Darius Locke / Murray
 Patrick McCray as Chief Engineer Jack McGuire / Dr. Clairemont
 Brian Bonner as Chief of Security and Tactical Officer Thomas J. Plummer / General Kailagg
 Gabriel Diani as Chief Medical Officer Kyle Wilson
 Etta Devine as Helmsman Susan Palmer
 Tiffany Tallent as Science Officer Numi Natukov and Media Liaison Kelly Natukov
 James Francis as Science Officer Stephen Knight (Season 2)
 Jim Manikas as Communications Officer Peter Gillmohr
 Sam Stinson as Narrator / Voice of the Series (Season 2)
 Joe Klein as Narrator / Voice of the Series (Season 1)
 Cheralyn Lambeth as Computer Voice

Recurring and guest characters
 Corinne Tandy as Operations Officer, Telara, and Nurse Beldon.
 Craig Clayton as Engineering Officer Michaels
 Matt Adams as Security Officer Meechum
 Alec Lee as Benjamin Poole
 Ben Nelson as Ensign Martin
 James Francis as Ensign Bishop
 John Mayer as Constable Delnya
 Charles Miller as Sytok
 Giles Aston as Barman
 Tyler McBride as Waiter
 Justin Plummer as Starbase Engineer
 Dr. Wohlschlegel as Himself
 Tom Cook as Admiral Shore (Integration)

Production crew
 Andy Tyrer - Creator, Executive Producer, Writer, Director, Editor (Season 1)
 Sebastian Prooth - Creator, Executive Producer, Writer, Director
 Patrick McCray - Executive Producer, Writer, Director
 David Raines, Writer
 Tim Renshaw - Additional Sound Editing (Season 1)
 Tom Cook - Additional Sound Editing (Season 1)

Awards and recognition

 For the pilot episode, Star Trek: The Continuing Mission was featured and reviewed on the December 20, 2007 edition of CNN.com 3
 In January 2009 TrekMovie.com named Star Trek: The Continuing Mission 'Best of 2008' 6

Episodes

Guest stars

References

External links
 Star Trek: The Continuing Mission
 Article about Star Trek: The Continuing Mission (12/20/07) on CNN.com
 Interview with Sebastian Prooth and Andy Tyrer on Slice of Sci-Fi
 Review of pilot episode on About.com
 Interview with Sebastian Prooth on About.com

2007 web series debuts
Continuing Mission